Ujejsce is a dzielnica (borough, district) of Dąbrowa Górnicza, a city in Poland.

List of street names in Ujejsce

Dąbrowa Górnicza